A referendum on a law revoking privatisation deals was held in Lithuania on 27 August 1994. The proposed law put forward procedures for reversing privatisation deals conducted in a non-transparent manner, as well as compensating citizens for the loss of savings caused by inflation. A total of eight questions were asked, and although around 89% voted in favour of all of them, the voter turnout of 39.6% meant that the threshold of 50% of registered voters voting in favour was not passed, resulting in the proposal failing.

Results

Question I

References

1994 referendums
1994 in Lithuania
Referendums in Lithuania
Economy of Lithuania
Government of Lithuania
Privatization in Europe
Reform in Lithuania
Privatisation referendums